Hydroxytropacocaine is a tropane alkaloid found in Erythroxylum coca.

See also 
 Coca alkaloids

References 

Tropane alkaloids found in Erythroxylum coca
Benzoate esters
Tertiary alcohols